Bhadwamata or Bhadvamata is a holy temple situated in the Neemuch district of Madhya Pradesh at the distance of 18km. It is a beautifully constructed marble temple of Mahamaya Bhadwa Mata.

Significance 
The Bhadwamata statue is surrounded by nine Nabhdurga idols namely Brahmi, Maheswari, Kaumari, Vaishnavi, Varahi followed by Narsinhi, Eandri, Shivdatti and Chamunda. The Bhadwa Mata Temple is one of the important temples in India that depicts Shakti. The devotees of Bhadwa Mata Temple attain ultimate peace of mind and become spiritually strong after their visit to this temple. The holy water Baawdi situated within the premises of the temple is popularly known as Aarogya Theerth. This holy water is famous because a bath in this pond is believed to be a supernatural remedy for all kinds of skin diseases.

This temple is of considerable religious significance, which tends to generate crowds on weekends and on religious holidays. Local people have huge faith in Bhadva Mata as they believe taking baths within the well located in the temple area provides cures for paralyzing diseases such as Polio. Navaratri is the major festival of this temple, which involves priests decorating Mata Idol with beautiful clothes and jewelries.

References

External links 

 Tourist places in neemuch
 Hindu pilgrimage sites in India

Temples in Madhya Pradesh
Neemuch
Hindu pilgrimage sites in India